Panionios Women's Basketball is the women's basketball department of Panionios GSS, the Greek multi-sport club based in Nea Smyrni. The first basketball department of the club was founded in 1919 and was one of the first in Greece. The women's department in turn was established in the post-war period. Its last reconstitution took place in the late 1990s. The club plays in A2 Ethniki (2nd tier) but recently it has played in A1 Ethniki. They have won one Greek Championship, in 2007.

History
Panionios Women's basketball team was founded in 1947. It took part in the local championship of Athens-Piraeus since those years there wasn't a Panhellenic women championship. The club ceased its activities for some years but it returned in action in the late 1990s. Panionios achieved to win the Panhellenic championship immediately after its promotion to A1 Ethniki. It is the only time that a Greek team wins a championship coming from a second division. The next years, Panionios is weakened and the current season it plays in A2 Ethniki.

Recent seasons

Honours
Greek Women's Basketball League
Winners (1): 2007
Runners-up (1): 2008
Greek Women's Basketball Cup
Runners-up (1): 2017

Roster

References

External links
 Official page
Women Panionios B.C. at Eurobasket.com

Panionios
Women's basketball teams in Greece
Basketball teams established in 1947
Basketball teams in Athens